The 1972 Major League Baseball postseason was the playoff tournament of Major League Baseball for the 1972 season. The winners of each division advance to the postseason and face each other in a League Championship Series to determine the pennant winners that face each other in the World Series.

In the American League, the Detroit Tigers made their first postseason appearance since the 1968 World Series, and the Oakland Athletics made their second straight postseason appearance. In the National League, the Cincinnati Reds returned for the second time in three years, and the Pittsburgh Pirates made their third straight postseason appearance.

The playoffs began on October 7, 1972, and concluded on October 22, 1972, with the Oakland Athletics defeating the Cincinnati Reds in seven games in the 1972 World Series. It was the Athletics' sixth title in franchise history and first since 1930, when the team was still based in Philadelphia.

Playoff seeds
The following teams qualified for the postseason:

American League
 Detroit Tigers – AL East champions, 86–70
 Oakland Athletics – AL West champions, AL best record, 93–62

National League
 Pittsburgh Pirates – NL East champions, NL best record, MLB best record, 96–59
 Cincinnati Reds – NL West champions, 95–59

Playoff bracket

American League Championship Series

Detroit Tigers vs. Oakland Athletics

This was the first postseason meeting between the Tigers and Athletics. Despite blowing a 2-0 series lead, the Athletics narrowly defeated the Tigers to advance to the World Series for the first time since 1931, when the team was still based out of Philadelphia (in the process denying a rematch of the 1940 World Series between the Tigers and Reds). 

Game 1 went eleven innings - the Tigers took a 2-1 lead in the top of the eleventh, but the Athletics rallied to win by a 3-2 score in the bottom of the inning. Blue Moon Odom pitched a solid game for the Athletics in Game 2 as they shut out the Tigers by a 5-0 score to take a 2-0 series lead.

Game 2 was the most controversial of the series. Athletics shortstop Bert Campaneris came to bat, having had three hits, two runs scored, and two stolen bases in his first three at-bats in the game. Tigers relief pitcher Lerrin LaGrow's first pitch hit Campaneris in the ankle; he staggered for a moment, glared at LaGrow and then flung his bat toward the mound. The benches cleared, and while there were no punches thrown or other incidents involving players, Tigers manager Billy Martin had to be restrained by umpires and teammates to prevent him from going after Campaneris. Both LaGrow and Campaneris were suspended for the rest of the ALCS.

When the series shifted to Detroit for Game 3, the Tigers defeated the Athletics by a 3-0 score, as Joe Coleman pitched a complete game shutout. Game 4 was the most memorable of the series - the game remained tied at one after nine innings, and in the top of the tenth, the Athletics took a 3-1 lead, and it appeared as if the Tigers were finished. However, in the bottom of the tenth, the Tigers rallied, as Dick McAuliffe and Al Kaline hit back-to-back singles. Oakland relief pitcher Joe Horlen then threw a wild pitch which advanced the runners to second and third and he walked Gates Brown to load the bases with no outs. Bill Freehan then grounded an apparent double play ball to third, but the inexperienced Tenace at second dropped Sal Bando's throw. McAuliffe scored and everybody was safe. Dave Hamilton then relieved Horlen and promptly walked Norm Cash to tie the game, and then gave up a walk-off single to Jim Northrup, a ball hit over right fielder Matty Alou's head (the outfield was drawn in), scoring Brown with the winning run as the Tigers evened the series and forced a fifth game. In Game 5, the Tigers took an early lead in the bottom of the first, but the Athletics would put two unanswered runs on the board in the second and fourth innings respectively to secure the pennant.

This was the first of three consecutive AL pennants won by the Athletics. They would win it again in 1973 and 1974, both coming against the Baltimore Orioles. The Tigers would not return to the postseason again until 1984, where they went on to win the World Series.

Both the Athletics and Tigers would meet again in the 2006 ALCS, as well as the 2012 and 2013 ALDS, with the Tigers winning all three meetings.

National League Championship Series

Cincinnati Reds vs. Pittsburgh Pirates

This was a rematch of the 1970 NLCS, which the Reds won in a 3-0 sweep. The Reds once again came out on top, knocking off the defending World Series champion Pirates in a close 5 game series to return to the World Series for the second time in three years.

The Pirates cruised to a 5-1 victory in Game 1 off a strong pitching performance from Steve Blass, while the Reds evened the series in Game 2 by holding off a rally by the Pirates. When the series shifted to Cincinnati, the Pirates took Game 3 by a 3-2 score to take a 2-1 series lead. In Game 4, the Reds blew out the Pirates by a 7-1 score off a two-hit complete game performance from starting pitcher Ross Grimsley. Game 5 was the nailbiter of the series - the Pirates led 3-2 going into the bottom of the ninth and were three outs away from winning back-to-back NL pennants. Then, Reds' catcher Johnny Bench hit a solo home run to tie the game. Then, Tony Pérez singled and was replaced by pinch-runner George Foster. Denis Menke followed with another single as Foster moved to second base. With the count 2-0 on César Gerónimo, Pirates' closer Dave Giusti was replaced with Game 2 starter Bob Moose. Geronimo's fly ball out advanced Foster to third, but Moose induced shortstop Darrell Chaney to pop out as Foster stayed at third. Just when it looked like Moose may wiggle out of a tough two-on, no out situation, he uncorked a wild pitch to pinch-hitter Hal McRae scoring Foster with the winning run, securing the pennant for the Reds. It was the first time a postseason series ended on a wild pitch since the 1927 World Series in which the Pirates were swept by the New York Yankees. 

The Reds returned to the NLCS the next year, but they were upset by the 82-win New York Mets in five games. The Pirates would make the postseason again in 1974, but they would fall to the Los Angeles Dodgers in four games in the NLCS. They would not win the pennant again until 1979.

1972 World Series

Oakland Athletics (AL) vs. Cincinnati Reds (NL) 

†: postponed from October 17 due to rain

This was the first World Series meeting between the Reds and Athletics, as well as the first World Series since 1968 to not feature the Baltimore Orioles. Despite blowing a 3-1 series lead, the Athletics held on to win Game 7 and their first title since 1930. 

The Athletics took Game 1 thanks to a go-ahead solo home run from catcher Gene Tenace, and Catfish Hunter and Rollie Fingers helped lead the A's to victory again in Game 2 to go up 2-0 in the series headed to Oakland. In Game 3, Jack Billingham and Clay Carroll helped the Reds shutout the Athletics 1-0 to avoid a sweep. In Game 4, the Reds held a 2-1 lead going into the bottom of the ninth and were on the verge of evening the series. Then, the Athletics strung together four consecutive hits to score two runs, and took a 3-1 series lead. The Reds narrowly took Game 5 to send the series back to Cincinnati, and then proceeded to blow out the Athletics in Game 6 to force a seventh game. However, the Athletics, thanks again to Hunter and Fingers, narrowly prevailed by a 3-2 score to secure the title. This was the first championship of the four major North American sports leagues won by a team from the San Francisco Bay Area.

The Athletics' victory marked the start of a dynasty for the franchise, as they would win the World Series again in 1973 and 1974 over the New York Mets and Los Angeles Dodgers respectively to complete a three-peat. They would also win another title in 1989 over their cross-town rivals in the San Francisco Giants.

The Reds returned to the World Series in 1975, where they defeated the Boston Red Sox in seven games. The Reds and Athletics would meet again in the 1990 World Series, where the Reds shockingly upset the Athletics in a 4-game sweep.

References

External links
 League Baseball Standings & Expanded Standings - 1972

 
Major League Baseball postseason